Sir Richard Torin Kindersley (1792–1879) was an English lawyer and judge.  He was born, the eldest son of Nathaniel Edward Kindersley, at Madras, India, in 1792, and educated at Haileybury and Trinity College, Cambridge, becoming a fellow in 1815 and M.A. in 1817. He was called to the Bar (Lincoln's Inn) in 1818 and developed a Chancery practice.  From 1847 to 1851, he served as Chancellor of the County Palatine of Durham.  In 1848 he was appointed Master in Chancery, followed by an appointment as Vice-Chancellor in 1851.  He had a reputation as a sound equity judge.  He retired in 1866, but continued to sit on the Judicial Committee of the Privy Council.

References

Fellows of Trinity College, Cambridge
19th-century English judges
Members of the Judicial Committee of the Privy Council
1792 births
1879 deaths
Members of the Privy Council of the United Kingdom
Richard